Neptunomonas phycophila is a Gram-negative, anaerobic and rod-shaped bacterium from the genus of Neptunomonas which has been isolated from the eukaryota Symbiodinium from Puerto Rico.

References

Oceanospirillales
Bacteria described in 2015